Kendall's rock gecko (Cnemaspis kendallii) is a species of gecko, a lizard in the family Gekkonidae. The species is endemic to Borneo and the Malaysian peninsula.

Reproduction
C. kendallii is oviparous.

References

Further reading
Boulenger GA (1885). Catalogue of the Lizards in the British Museum (Natural History). Second Edition. Volume I. Geckonidæ ... London: Trustees of the British Museum (Natural History). (Taylor and Francis, printers). xii + 436 pp. + Plates I-XXXII. (Gonatodes kendallii, new combination, pp. 63–64 + Plate V, figures 4, 4a).
Das I (2006). A Photographic Guide to Snakes and other Reptiles of Borneo. Sanibel Island, Florida: Ralph Curtis Books. 144 pp. . (Cnemaspis kendallii, p. 90).
Gray JE (1845). Catalogue of the Specimens of Lizards in the Collection of the British Museum. London: Trustees of the British Museum. (Edward Newman, printer). xxviii + 289 pp. (Heteronota kendallii, new species, p. 174).

kendallii
Reptiles described in 1845
Taxa named by John Edward Gray